Roshtqal'a is a village and jamoat in Gorno-Badakhshan Autonomous Region in south-east Tajikistan. It is the seat of Roshtqal'a District in Gorno-Badakhshan Autonomous Region in south-east Tajikistan. The jamoat has a total population of 2,838 (2015).

References

Populated places in Gorno-Badakhshan